was a Japanese samurai of the Sengoku period and the eldest son of Akechi Mitsuhide. He stayed at Kameyama Castle when the Honnoji Incident occurred. 

In 1582, during Honnoji Incident, after Oda Nobutada died at the Nijo Palace, he moved to Sakamoto Castle in Omi Province and was engaged in the defense of western provinces. 

Later, When his father, Mitsuhide, was defeated in the Battle of Yamazaki, he was under attack by Nakagawa Kiyohide and Dom Justo Takayama, whereupon he committed suicide.

1569 births
1582 deaths
Samurai
Suicides by seppuku
Akechi clan
16th-century suicides